Jean-Luc Foudy (born May 13, 2002) is a Canadian professional ice hockey forward currently playing for the Colorado Eagles in the American Hockey League (AHL) as a prospect to the Colorado Avalanche of the National Hockey League (NHL). He was selected in the third-round, 75th overall, by the Avalanche in the 2020 NHL Entry Draft.

Playing career

Junior
Foudy played as a junior in Ontario, Canada with the Toronto Titans Minor Midget AAA's in the Greater Toronto Hockey League (GTHL), posting 25 goals and 602 points through 52 points in the before he was selected by major junior club, the Windsor Spitfires, 10th overall in the 2018 OHL Priority Selection Draft. 

In committing to the Spitfires, Foudy joined the team for the 2018–19 season and was immediately relied upon as an offensive threat, leading the team and the league as a rookie with 41 assists. On the Spitfires top-line, Foudy finished with 9 goals and 49 points through 63 regular season games. 

In his draft eligible 2019–20 season, Foudy continued his development by posting 15 goals and 43 points through 59 regular season games before the playoffs were cancelled due to the beginning of the COVID-19 pandemic. After he was rated the 33rd North American skater by the NHL Central Scouting Bureau, on October 8, 2020, Foudy was selected in the third-round, 75th overall, of the 2020 NHL Entry Draft by the Colorado Avalanche.

Professional
With the impact of the ongoing pandemic affecting the commencement of the OHL, Foudy opted to continue his development in accepting a loan assignment by the Spitfires to join Swedish third-tier club, Mörrums GoIS of the Hockeyettan on November 27, 2020. In making his professional debut, Foudy featured in 10 games, collecting 2 goal and 3 points before ending his brief tenure in the HockeyEtta to return to North America signing an amateur tryout contract to attend the training camp of the Avalanche's AHL affiliate, the Colorado Eagles, on January 16, 2021. 

With the OHL later confirming the cancellation of the season, Foudy remained with the Eagles for the duration of the 2020–21 shortened  season, recording 3 goals and 14 points in 34 games, finishing fourth on the team in points and second in assists. He added one point in 2 postseason contests, as Colorado were defeated in the final game of the Pacific Division's play-in tournament.

On May 26, 2021, Foudy was signed by the Avalanche to a three-year, entry-level contract. With his junior career completed due to an exemption to continue his development in the AHL following the interruption of the COVID-19 pandemic, Foudy continued to show his offensive potential in the 2021–22 season, increasing his output with 9 goals and 17 assists for 26 points through 65 regular season games. He broke out in the playoffs for the Eagles, notching 4 goals and 7 points through 9 contests. 

In joining the Avalanche on the road, Foudy made his NHL debut the following day in a 5-0 shutout defeat to the Winnipeg Jets on November 29, 2022.

Personal
Foudy's parents were both athletes: his mother France Gareau was an Olympic sprinter who won a silver medal at the 1984 Summer Olympics and his father Sean Foudy played in the Canadian Football League for the Ottawa Rough Riders and BC Lions from 1989 to 1994. His older brother, Liam is also a professional hockey player, currently under contract with the Columbus Blue Jackets in the NHL.

Career statistics

Regular season and playoffs

International

Awards and honours

References

External links
 

2002 births
Living people
Colorado Avalanche draft picks
Colorado Avalanche players
Colorado Eagles players
Windsor Spitfires players